Wilhelm Camphausen (8 February 1818, Düsseldorf16 June 1885, Düsseldorf), was a German painter who specialized in historical and battle scenes.

Biography
He studied under Alfred Rethel and Friedrich Wilhelm Schadow. As an historical and battle painter he rapidly became popular, and in 1859 was made professor of painting at the Düsseldorf Academy, together with other later distinctions. His Flight of Tilly (1841), Prince Eugene of Savoy at the Battle of Belgrade (1843; in the Cologne Museum), Flight of Charles II after the Battle of Worcester (Berlin National Gallery), Cromwell's Cavalry (Munich Pinakothek), are his principal earlier pictures; and his Frederick the Great at Potsdam, Frederick II and the Bayreuth Dragoons at Hohenfriedburg. He is associated with the Düsseldorf school of painting.

In 1864, he accompanied the Prussian forces during the Schleswig-Holstein campaign and painted several scenes of the fighting as well as scenes of the War of 1866 (notably Lines of Dybbøl after the Battle, at the Berlin National Gallery), made him famous in Germany as a representative of patriotic historical art. He also painted many portraits of German princes and celebrated soldiers and statesmen. In the 1870 Franco-Prussian War Camphausen served in the German army as an official war artist.

Works By
 Camphausen, Wilhelm (1865). Ein Maler auf dem Kriegsfelde: illustrirtes Tagebuch. Bielefeld: Velhagen und Klasing.
 Camphausen, Wilhelm (1880). Vaterländische Reiterbilder aus drei Jahrhunderten von W. Camphausen; text von Theodor Fontane; Illustrationen des Textes gezeichnet von L. Burger. Berlin: R. Schuster.

See also

 List of German painters

References

1818 births
1885 deaths
Artists from Düsseldorf
People from the Province of Jülich-Cleves-Berg
19th-century German painters
19th-century German male artists
German male painters
German war artists
German history painters
Austro-Prussian War
19th-century war artists
Düsseldorf school of painting
Academic staff of Kunstakademie Düsseldorf
Kunstakademie Düsseldorf alumni